Familial hemiplegic migraine (FHM) is an autosomal dominant type of hemiplegic migraine that typically includes weakness of half the body which can last for hours, days, or weeks. It can be accompanied by other symptoms, such as ataxia, coma, and paralysis. Migraine attacks may be provoked by minor head trauma. Some cases of minor head trauma in patients with hemiplegic migraine can develop into delayed cerebral edema, a life-threatening medical emergency. Clinical overlap occurs in some FHM patients with episodic ataxia type 2 and spinocerebellar ataxia type 6, benign familial infantile epilepsy, and alternating hemiplegia of childhood.

Three genetic loci for FHM  are known. FHM1, which accounts for about 50% of FHM patients, is caused by mutations in a gene coding for the P/Q-type calcium channel α subunit, CACNA1A. FHM1 is also associated with cerebellar degeneration. FHM2, which accounts for less than 25% of cases, is caused by mutations in the /-ATPase gene ATP1A2. FHM3 is a rare subtype of FHM and is caused by mutations in a sodium channel α-subunit coding gene, SCN1A. These three subtypes do not account for all cases of FHM, suggesting the existence of at least one other locus (FHM4).

Also, nonfamilial cases of hemiplegic migraine are seen, termed sporadic hemiplegic migraine. These cases seem to have the same causes as the familial cases and represent de novo mutations. Sporadic cases are also clinically identical to familial cases with the exception of a lack of known family history of attacks.

Signs and symptoms
FHM signs overlap significantly with those of migraine with aura. In short, FHM is typified by migraine with aura associated with hemiparesis, and in FHM1, cerebellar degeneration, which can result in episodic or progressive ataxia. FHM can also present with the same signs as benign familial infantile convulsions and alternating hemiplegia of childhood. Other symptoms are altered consciousness (in fact, some cases seem related to head trauma), gaze-evoked nystagmus, and coma. Aura symptoms, such as numbness and blurring of vision, typically persist for 30–60 minutes, but can last for weeks to months. An attack resembles a stroke, but unlike a stroke, it resolves in time. These signs typically first manifest themselves in the first or second decade of life.

Causes
See the equivalent section in the main migraine article.

FHM mutations are believed to lead to migraine susceptibility by lowering the threshold for cortical-spreading-depression generation. The FHM1 and FHM3 mutations occur in ion channels expressed in neurons. These mutations may lead to both the hyper- and hypoexcitable neurons that might underlie cortical-spreading-depression. How the mutations seen in FHM2 patients might lead to FHM symptoms is even less clear, as the gene mutated in FHM2 is expressed primarily in astrocytes. One proposal states that the depolarization of astrocytes caused by haploinsufficiency of the ATP1A2 /-ATPase causes increased release of compounds such as adenosine from astrocytes. These compounds then interact with neighboring neurons, altering their excitability and leading to cortical-spreading-depression and migraine.

Pathophysiology

FHM1 (CACNA1A)
The first discovered FHM locus was the CACNA1A gene (originally named CACNL1A4), which encodes the P/Q-type calcium channel CaV2.1. Currently, 17  mutations in this channel are known (table 1), and these mutations are distributed throughout the channel. Some of these mutations result in patients with notable cerebellar degeneration or other dysfunction, including one mutation (S218L), which may be related to severe responses to mild concussion, up to and including delayed cerebral edema, coma, and death. Fifteen of these mutants have received at least some further analysis at the electrophysiological level to attempt to determine how they might lead to the FHM1 phenotype. Contradiction in the literature is increasing as to the end result of these mutations on channel kinetics and neuronal excitability.

A good example of this contradiction can be seen in the literature regarding the R192Q mutation. The first investigation of this mutation, using the rabbit isoform of the channel expressed in oocytes, found that it did not alter any measured channel properties. A subsequent report, using human channels expressed in HEK293 cells, found a small, hyperpolarizing shift in the midpoint for activation, a result common among FHM1 mutants. This shift results in channels that open at more negative potentials, thus have a higher open probability than wild-type channels at most potentials. This report also found that the R192Q mutant produced almost twice as much whole-cell current compared to wild-type channels. This is not due to a change in single channel conductance, but to an equivalent increase in channel density. A subsequent group noticed that this mutation is in a region important for modulation by G protein-coupled receptors (GPCRs). GPCR activation leads to inhibition of wild-type CaV2.1 currents. R192Q mutant channel currents are also decreased by GPCR activation, but by a smaller amount. A more recent group has confirmed some of these results by creating a R192Q knock-in mouse. They confirmed that the R192Q mutant activates at more negative potentials and that neurons producing these channels have much larger whole-cell current. This resulted in a much larger quantal content (the number of neurotransmitter packets released per action potential) and generally enhanced neurotransmitter release in R192Q-expressing neurons versus wild-type. Consequently, these mutant mice were more susceptible to cortical-spreading-depression than their wild-type counterparts. The most recent experiments on this mutant, however, have contradicted some of these results. In CaV2.1 knockout neurons transfected with human channels, P/Q-type currents from mutant channels are actually smaller than their wild-type counterpart. They also found a significant decrease in calcium influx during depolarization, leading to decreased quantal content, in mutant versus wild-type expressing neurons. Neurons expressing mutant channels were also less able to mediate inhibitory input and have smaller inhibitory postsynaptic currents through P/Q-type channels. Further testing with this and other mutants is required to determine their end effect on human physiology.

FHM2 (ATP1A2)

The second subtype of familial hemiplegic migraine, FHM2, is caused by mutations in the gene ATP1A2 that encodes a /-ATPase. This /-ATPase is heavily expressed in astrocytes and helps to set and maintain their reversal potential. Twenty-nine known mutations in this gene are associated with FHM2 (table 2), many clustering in the large intracellular loop between membrane-spanning segments 4 and 5 (figure 1). Twelve of these mutations have been studied by expression in model cells. All but one have shown either complete loss of function or more complex decreases in ATPase activity or potassium sensitivity. Astrocytes expressing these mutant ion pumps will have much higher resting potentials and are believed to lead to disease through a poorly understood mechanism.

FHM3 (SCN1A)
The final known locus FHM3 is the SCN1A gene, which encodes a sodium channel α subunit. The only study so far that has found mutations in this gene discovered the same Q1489K mutation in three of 20 families (15%) with 11 other kindreds (55%) already having mutations in CACNA1A or ATP1A2. This mutation is located in a highly conserved region of an intracellular loop connecting domains three and four. This mutation results in a greatly hastened (two- to four-fold) recovery from inactivation compared to wild-type. As this channel is important for action potential generation in neurons,  the Q1489K mutant is expected to result in hyperexcitable neurons.

FHM4 (1q31)
The final locus for FHM maps to the q-arm of chromosome 1. A number of attractive candidate genes occur in this area, though no mutations in them have yet been linked to FHM4.

Other genetic associations
A fourth gene associated with this condition is the proline-rich transmembrane protein 2 (PRRT2 gene) - an axonal protein associated with the exocytosis complex.

A fifth gene associated with this condition is SLC4A4, which encodes the electrogenic NaHCO3 cotransporter NBCe1.

Diagnosis
Diagnosis of FHM is made according to these criteria:
 Two attacks of each of:
Aura with motor weakness accompanied by either reversible visual symptoms (flickering lights, spots, lines, etc.), reversible sensory symptoms (pins and needles, numbness, etc.) or speech symptoms
At least two occurrences of:
One or more aura symptoms that develop over at least 5 minutes
These symptoms lasting more than 5 minutes and less than 24 hours
Headache beginning within 60 minutes of aura onset: These headaches can last 4–72 hours, occur on only one side of the head, pulsate, be of moderate to severe intensity, and may be aggravated by common physical activities such as walking. These headaches must also be accompanied by nausea/vomiting, phonophobia (avoidance of sound due to hypersensitivity), and/or photophobia (avoidance of light due to hypersensitivity).
 At least one close (first- or second-degree) relative with FHM
 No other likely cause

Sporadic forms follow the same diagnostic criteria, with the exception of family history.

In all cases, family and patient histories are used for diagnosis. Brain-imaging techniques, such as MRI, CAT scan, and SPECT, are used to look for signs of other familial conditions such as CADASIL or mitochondrial disease, and for evidence of cerebellar degeneration. With the discovery of causative genes, genetic sequencing can also be used to verify diagnosis (though not all genetic loci are known).

Screening
Prenatal screening is not typically done for FHM, but it may be performed if requested. As penetrance is high, individuals found to carry mutations should be expected to develop signs of FHM at some point in life.

Management
See the equivalent section in the main migraine article.

People with FHM are encouraged to avoid activities that may trigger their attacks. Minor head trauma is a common attack precipitant, so FHM sufferers should avoid contact sports. Acetazolamide or standard drugs are often used to treat attacks, though those leading to vasoconstriction should be avoided due to the risk of stroke.

Epidemiology
Migraine itself is a very common disorder, occurring in 15–20% of the population. Hemiplegic migraine, be it familial or spontaneous, is less prevalent, at 0.01% prevalence according to one report. Women are three times more likely to be affected than males.

See also
 Channelopathy
 Childhood absence epilepsy
 Hypokalemic periodic paralysis
 Juvenile myoclonic epilepsy
 Malignant hyperthermia
 Timothy syndrome

References

External links 
  GeneReviews/NCBI/NIH/UW entry on Familial Hemiplegic Migraine
 

Channelopathies
Headaches
Rare diseases